In enzymology, an acylglycerone-phosphate reductase is an enzyme that catalyzes the chemical reaction

1-palmitoylglycerol 3-phosphate + NADP+  palmitoylglycerone phosphate + NADPH + H+

Thus, the two substrates of this enzyme are 1-palmitoylglycerol 3-phosphate and NADP+, whereas its 3 products are palmitoylglycerone phosphate, NADPH, and H+.

This enzyme belongs to the family of oxidoreductases, specifically those acting on the CH-OH group of donor with NAD+ or NADP+ as acceptor. The systematic name of this enzyme class is 1-palmitoylglycerol-3-phosphate:NADP+ oxidoreductase. Other names in common use include palmitoyldihydroxyacetone-phosphate reductase, palmitoyl dihydroxyacetone phosphate reductase, palmitoyl-dihydroxyacetone-phosphate reductase, acyldihydroxyacetone phosphate reductase, and palmitoyl dihydroxyacetone phosphate reductase. This enzyme participates in glycerophospholipid and ether lipid metabolism.

References 

 

EC 1.1.1
NADPH-dependent enzymes
Enzymes of unknown structure